This is a list of the wealthiest Portuguese people by net worth. It is primarily based on data from The World's Billionaires publication by Forbes magazine, as well as other sources.

List of wealthiest people

See also
 The World's Billionaires
 List of countries by the number of billionaires

References

Lists of people by wealth
Net worth